Saint-Michel (Languedocien: Sent Miquèl) is a commune in the Ariège department in southwestern France.

Population
Inhabitants of Saint-Michel are called Saint-Micheliens.

See also
Communes of the Ariège department

References

Communes of Ariège (department)
Ariège communes articles needing translation from French Wikipedia